Richard Alfred How (born December 1944) was a rugby union player who represented Australia.

How, a wing, was born in Armidale, New South Wales and claimed 1 international rugby cap for Australia.

References

Australian rugby union players
Australia international rugby union players
1944 births
Living people
Rugby union players from Armidale, New South Wales
Rugby union wings